Financial Supervisory Authority (FI) is the Swedish government agency responsible for financial regulation in Sweden.  It is responsible for the oversight, regulation and authorisation of financial markets and their participants.  The agency falls under the Swedish Ministry of Finance and regulates all organisations that provide financial services in Sweden.

History
FI was formed 1991 to create a single integrated regulator covering banking, securities, and insurance in Sweden.  This was done with the merging of the former banking and insurance supervisory bodies, the Bank Inspectorate and the Insurance Supervision Authority.

Responsibilities
FI's primary responsibility is market stability and the monitoring of financial markets and participants.  It also has a responsibility to provide consumer protection in relation to financial products.  One of its tasks is monitoring for instability that will negatively affect the Swedish financial system.  If it believes that this is the case it has a duty to report that to the Swedish government who are responsible for taking any action.

The authority has three main activities:

 Issue of permits to companies that wish to provide financial services
 Designing rules and regulations for financial activities
 Supervision of these rules and the performance of risk assessments

Notable cases 
In June 2020, FI fined SEB 1 billion crowns ($107.11 million) for failures in compliance and governance in relation to anti-money laundering regulations in the Baltics.

Organisational structure
FI is a Swedish government central administrative authority that falls under the Swedish Ministry of Finance.  It is run by an eight-member board which is appointed by the government. This includes the head of the agency, the Director General.

Directors General
 2015–2022: Erik Thedéen
 2009–2015: Martin Andersson
 2008–2009: Eric Saers (acting)
 2003–2008: Ingrid Bonde
 1993–2002: Claes Norgren
 1991–1993: Anders Sahlén

See also 
 Financial regulation
 Government agencies in Sweden
 Securities Commission

References

External links 
  
 Official website in English 

Financial Supervisory Authority
Financial Supervisory Authority
Regulation in Sweden
Financial regulatory authorities of Sweden
Government agencies established in 1991
1991 establishments in Sweden